Larry Di Ianni (born Renzo Pasquale Di Ianni, 1948) is an Italian-Canadian politician and educator who served as the 54th mayor of Hamilton from 2003 to 2006. Prior to his tenure as mayor, he served as a town councillor in Stoney Creek and a city councillor in the amalgamated City of Hamilton.

Early life
Di Ianni immigrated to Canada from Italy in 1956 as a boy. Following his father, who had immigrated years before the family and found work at Stelco, Di Ianni and his family settled in an apartment on Cannon Street. Pressured by his mother, an assembly-line worker in a shoe factory, to receive a university education, Di Ianni graduated from McMaster University with a Bachelor's degree in English and went on to receive his Master's Degree in Education from the University of Toronto soon after.

After graduating, Di Ianni moved with his wife Janet and three children, Robert, Paul and Stephanie, to Stoney Creek. There, Di Ianni was hired by the Hamilton-Wentworth Catholic District School Board as a high school teacher and quickly worked his way up to the position of principal.

Political history
Di Ianni was first elected to Stoney Creek council in 1982, where he served for six terms until the amalgamation of the town into Hamilton. Following amalgamation, Di Ianni was elected to Hamilton City Council as councillor for Ward Ten, defeating former Stoney Creek deputy mayor Albert Marrone and town councillor Maria Pearson in a hotly contested race. Di Ianni served one term as a Hamilton councillor until November 2003.

In early March 2003, Di Ianni was approached by members of the Ontario Liberals, including then-Premier Dalton McGuinty, in an effort to convince him to run provincially against Labour Minister Brad Clark. Di Ianni ultimately declined the offer, noting that he wished to focus on municipal issues.

In the same month, sitting Hamilton mayor Bob Wade announced he would not seek re-election in the 2003 municipal election. On April 28, 2003, Di Ianni announced he would seek the office of mayor indicating that he believed Hamilton to be at a crossroads with regard to development. Di Ianni's main opponent in the race was former provincial NDP cabinet minister David Christopherson and the race focused considerably on the construction of the Red Hill Expressway, of which Di Ianni was in favour and Christopherson was opposed. The candidates sparred frequently on the campaign trail, with Di Ianni promoting his municipal experience and support from the business community while Christopherson highlighted his time in cabinet and support from organized labour and progressive political organizations. On election night, Di Ianni defeated Christopherson by a margin of 52% to 39%. Speaking to reporters, Di Ianni noted he was immensely happy that the voters of Hamilton elected their first Italian-Canadian mayor by such a large margin.

Di Ianni's term as mayor saw him attempt to enact his mayoral platform by addressing such issues as the completion of the Red Hill Expressway, business tax reduction, airport development, improving relations among the amalgamated municipalities, and obtaining additional social service funding from the more senior levels of government.

On July 10, 2006 Di Ianni, along with two other unsuccessful candidates, were charged under the Provincial Offences Act of Ontario for violating the Municipal Elections Act of Ontario.  On August 24, 2006, he accepted responsibility by pleading guilty for violating the Provincial Offences Act related to accepting inappropriate campaign donations. The Superior Court Justice exercised leniency as he deemed the violations to be unintentional and considered Di Ianni's good community service record. The Justice also likened the violation to a speeding ticket and withdrew the remaining charges. He lost the mayoralty to Fred Eisenberger in the 2006 municipal election.

In the 2008 federal election, Di Ianni was the Liberal candidate in the federal riding of Hamilton East—Stoney Creek, losing the race to incumbent MP Wayne Marston of the NDP by a margin of 6,464 votes.

Di Ianni ran unsuccessfully for mayor of Hamilton in October 2010.

Electoral record

|- style="background-color:#fcfcfc;"
!rowspan="2" colspan="2" style="text-align:center;" |Candidate
!colspan="3" style="text-align:center;" |Popular vote
|- style="background-color:#fcfcfc;"
| style="text-align:center;" | Votes
| style="text-align:center;" |%
| style="text-align:center;" |±%
|-
| style="background-color:#3FFF00;" |
| style="text-align:left;" | Bob Bratina
| style="text-align:right;" |52,684
| style="text-align:right;" |37.32%
| style="text-align:right;" |n/a
|-
| style="background-color:#FF0000;" |
| style="text-align:left;" | Larry Di Ianni
| style="text-align:right;" |40,091
| style="text-align:right;" |28.40%
| style="text-align:right;" |-14.44%
|-
| style="background-color:#66023C;" |
| style="text-align:left;" | Fred Eisenberger (incumbent)
| style="text-align:right;" |38,719
| style="text-align:right;" |27.43%
| style="text-align:right;" |-15.78%
|-
| style="background-color:#69359C;" |
| style="text-align:left;" | Michael Baldasaro
| style="text-align:right;" |2,892
| style="text-align:right;" |2.05%
| style="text-align:right;" |-1.56%
|-
| style="background-color:#9BDDFF"|
| style="text-align:left;" | Tone Marrone
| style="text-align:right;" |1,052
| style="text-align:right;" |0.75%
| style="text-align:right;" |n/a
|-
| style="background-color:#00563F;" |
| style="text-align:left;" | Mahesh Butani
| style="text-align:right;" |950
| style="text-align:right;" |0.67%
| style="text-align:right;" |n/a
|-
| style="background-color:#00BFFF;" |
| style="text-align:left;" | Glenn Hamilton
| style="text-align:right;" |949
| style="text-align:right;" |0.67%
| style="text-align:right;" |n/a
|-
| style="background-color:#E4D00A;" |
| style="text-align:left;" | Pasquale (Pat) Filice
| style="text-align:right;" |768
| style="text-align:right;" |0.54%
| style="text-align:right;" |n/a
|-
| style="background-color:#4F7942;" |
| style="text-align:left;" | Ken Leach
| style="text-align:right;" |577
| style="text-align:right;" |0.41%
| style="text-align:right;" |n/a
|-
| style="background-color:#C19A6B;" |
| style="text-align:left;" | Andrew Haines
| style="text-align:right;" |557
| style="text-align:right;" |0.39%
| style="text-align:right;" |n/a
|-
| style="background-color:#8DB600"|
| style="text-align:left;" | Mark Wozny
| style="text-align:right;" |433
| style="text-align:right;" |0.31%
| style="text-align:right;" |n/a
|-
| style="background-color:#FF9966;" |
| style="text-align:left;" | Steven Waxman
| style="text-align:right;" |429
| style="text-align:right;" |0.30%
| style="text-align:right;" |n/a
|-
| style="background-color:#B2BEB5;" |
| style="text-align:left;" | Edward Graydon 
| style="text-align:right;" |404
| style="text-align:right;" |0.29%
| style="text-align:right;" |n/a
|-
| style="background-color:#5D8AA8;" |
| style="text-align:left;" | Gino Speziale
| style="text-align:right;" |356
| style="text-align:right;" |0.25%
| style="text-align:right;" |-0.77%
|-
| style="background-color:#663854;" |
| style="text-align:left;" | Victor Veri
| style="text-align:right;" |313
| style="text-align:right;" |0.22%
| style="text-align:right;" |n/a
|-
| style="text-align:right;background-color:#FFFFFF;" colspan="2" |Total votes
| style="text-align:right;background-color:#FFFFFF;" |141,174
| style="text-align:right;background-color:#FFFFFF;" |100%
| style="text-align:right;background-color:#FFFFFF;" |
|- 
| style="text-align:right;background-color:#FFFFFF;" colspan="2" |Registered voters
| style="text-align:right;background-color:#FFFFFF;" |353,317
| style="text-align:right;background-color:#FFFFFF;" |40.45%
| style="text-align:right;background-color:#FFFFFF;" |+3.2%
|- 
| style="text-align:left;" colspan="6" |Note: All Hamilton Municipal Elections are officially non-partisan.  Note: Candidate campaign colours are based on the prominent colour used in campaign items (signs, literature, etc.)and are used as a visual differentiation between candidates.
|- 
| style="text-align:left;" colspan="13" |Sources: Hamilton, Ontario, City Clerk's Office
|}

|- style="background-color:#fcfcfc;"
!rowspan="2" colspan="2" style="text-align:center;" |Candidate
!colspan="3" style="text-align:center;" |Popular vote
|- style="background-color:#fcfcfc;"
| style="text-align:center;" | Votes
| style="text-align:center;" |%
| style="text-align:center;" |±%
|-
| style="background-color:#66023C;" |
| style="text-align:left;" | Fred Eisenberger
| style="text-align:right;" | 54,110
| style="text-align:right;" | 43.21%
| style="text-align:right;" | n/a
|-
| style="background-color:#FF0000;" |
| style="text-align:left;" | Larry Di Ianni (Incumbent)
| style="text-align:right;" | 53,658
| style="text-align:right;" | 42.84%
| style="text-align:right;" | −8.08%
|-
| style="background-color:#00008B;" |
| style="text-align:left;" | Diane Elms
| style="text-align:right;" | 9,459
| style="text-align:right;" | 7.55%
| style="text-align:right;" | n/a
|-
| style="background-color:#69359C;" |
| style="text-align:left;" | Michael Baldasaro
| style="text-align:right;" | 4,520
| style="text-align:right;" | 3.61%
| style="text-align:right;" | +1.76%
|-
| style="background-color:#5D8AA8;" |
| style="text-align:left;" | Gino Speziale
| style="text-align:right;" | 1,274
| style="text-align:right;" | 1.02
| style="text-align:right;" | n/a
|-
| style="background-color:#4F7942;" |
| style="text-align:left;" | Steve Leach
| style="text-align:right;" | 1,250
| style="text-align:right;" | 1.00
| style="text-align:right;" | n/a
|-
| style="background-color:#FCF75E;" |
| style="text-align:left;" | Martin S. Zuliniak
| style="text-align:right;" | 968
| style="text-align:right;" | 0.77
| style="text-align:right;" | n/a
|-
| style="text-align:right;background-color:#FFFFFF;" colspan="2" |Total votes
| style="text-align:right;background-color:#FFFFFF;" |126,986
| style="text-align:right;background-color:#FFFFFF;" |100%
| style="text-align:right;background-color:#FFFFFF;" |
|- 
| style="text-align:right;background-color:#FFFFFF;" colspan="2" |Registered voters
| style="text-align:right;background-color:#FFFFFF;" |340,941
| style="text-align:right;background-color:#FFFFFF;" |37.25%
| style="text-align:right;background-color:#FFFFFF;" |−0.72%
|- 
| style="text-align:left;" colspan="6" |Note: All Hamilton Municipal Elections are officially non-partisan.  Note: Candidate campaign colours are based on the prominent colour used in campaign items (signs, literature, etc.)and are used as a visual differentiation between candidates.
|- 
| style="text-align:left;" colspan="13" |Sources: Hamilton, Ontario, City Clerk's Office
|}

|- style="background-color:#fcfcfc;"
!rowspan="2" colspan="2" style="text-align:center;" |Candidate
!colspan="3" style="text-align:center;" |Popular vote
|- style="background-color:#fcfcfc;"
| style="text-align:center;" | Votes
| style="text-align:center;" |%
| style="text-align:center;" |±%
|-
| style="background-color:#FF0000;" |
| style="text-align:left;" | Larry DiIanni
| style="text-align:right;" |70,539
| style="text-align:right;" |50.92%
| style="text-align:right;" |
|-
| style="background-color:#FF7F00;" |
| style="text-align:left;" | David Christopherson
| style="text-align:right;" |54,298
| style="text-align:right;" |39.20%
| style="text-align:right;" |
|-
| style="background-color:#ffffff;" |
| style="text-align:left;" | Dick Wildeman
| style="text-align:right;" |4,462
| style="text-align:right;" |3.22%
| style="text-align:right;" |
|-
| style="background-color:#ffffff;" |
| style="text-align:left;" | Michael Peters
| style="text-align:right;" |3,270
| style="text-align:right;" |2.36%
| style="text-align:right;" |
|-
| style="background-color:#ffffff;" |
| style="text-align:left;" | Tom Murray
| style="text-align:right;" |2,881
| style="text-align:right;" |2.08%
| style="text-align:right;" |
|-
| style="background-color:#69359C;" |
| style="text-align:left;" | Michael Baldasaro
| style="text-align:right;" |2,569
| style="text-align:right;" |1.85%
| style="text-align:right;" |
|-
| style="background-color:#ffffff;" |
| style="text-align:left;" | Matt Jelly
| style="text-align:right;" |510
| style="text-align:right;" |0.37%
| style="text-align:right;" |
|-
| style="text-align:right;background-color:#FFFFFF;" colspan="2" |Total votes
| style="text-align:right;background-color:#FFFFFF;" |139,902
| style="text-align:right;background-color:#FFFFFF;" |37.97%
| style="text-align:right;background-color:#FFFFFF;" |
|- 
| style="text-align:right;background-color:#FFFFFF;" colspan="2" |Registered voters
| style="text-align:right;background-color:#FFFFFF;" |368,480
| style="text-align:right;background-color:#FFFFFF;" |100%
| style="text-align:right;background-color:#FFFFFF;" |
|- 
| style="text-align:left;" colspan="6" |Note: All Hamilton Municipal Elections are officially non-partisan.  Note: Candidate campaign colours are based on the prominent colour used in campaign items (signs, literature, etc.)and are used as a visual differentiation between candidates.
|- 
| style="text-align:left;" colspan="13" |Sources: City of Hamilton, "2003 Results"
|}

References 

Italian emigrants to Canada
Mayors of Hamilton, Ontario
Living people
Candidates in the 2008 Canadian federal election
Ontario candidates for Member of Parliament
1948 births
Canadian educators
Liberal Party of Canada candidates for the Canadian House of Commons